WFNC (640 kHz) is an AM radio station in Fayetteville, North Carolina.  The station has a conservative talk format and is under ownership of Cumulus Media.  Its studios and transmitter are co-located in Fayetteville.

History
Victor Dawson managed Fayetteville's first radio station for his father John Gilbert Dawson. In 1940, WFNC signed on with 250 watts at 1420 AM. On March 29, 1941, the frequency changed to 1450 AM.

WFNC was a Mutual Broadcasting System affiliate. Later WFNC became a CBS Radio News affiliate and continues with CBS to the present time.

The frequency changed in 1947 to 940 AM with a power of 50,000 watts daytime and 1,000 watts night time directional antenna, and at 7:45 AM EST on Wednesday, January 15, 1986, Chief Engineer Terry Jordan threw the switch and WFNC switched to 640 AM with a power of 10,000 watts daytime and a night time power of 1,000 watts nondirectional antenna.

Beginning in November 1985, WFNC began to run ads or local teasers in the Fayetteville Observer newspaper showing the 9 slowly rolling to a 6 in its frequency. The ad showed on the actual day of the switch the new 640 logo.  After almost 40 years on 940 kHz it was decided the night time signal needed improvement.  Being on 940 kHz, WFNC could not transmit a signal north at night, since it had to protect the stations broadcasting from Canada. At sunset, when WFNC lowered power and changed to directional antenna, there were citizens a short distance north of town that could not hear the station due to definitive signal change. By changing to 640 kHz, WFNC could have a 1,000-watt night signal with a uniform circular pattern, which in essence increased its range to areas that had never heard WFNC after dark. The negative of all of that was that WFNC had to reduce its daytime power from 50,000 watts down to 10,000 watts, but to Mr. Dawson, that was well worth the effort to get more night time listeners.

In the days of top 40 music and later country music some of the professional announcers were Paul Michaels, Paul Gold, Ted Harris, Jackie Sands, Don Perkins, Dan Mitchell, Bob Brandon and Randy Jenkins. In the late evening and overnights WFNC played automated music and in the country music days carried the syndicated program entitled "Live from Gilleys". WFNC also aired Casey Kasem's "American Top 40" and later Don Bowman and Bob Kingsley's "American Country Countdown on Sunday afternoons.

Wendy Riddle, who joined the station in 1977, and news director Jeff Thompson co-hosted the morning show, entitled "Top of the Morning", which began in January 1977. They took turns as hosts of the station's other local talk show "Sound Off," the longest-running show on the station, having started in 1972 when WFNC still played top 40 music. "Sound Off" aired from 9-10AM Monday to Friday. Jeff Thompson primarily handled local news and in the late 1980s was joined in the afternoons by Johnnie Joyce, who had come over from WFAI. Joyce died in the late 1990s after having a monumental career in local news, not only at WFNC, but at WFLB, WFBS, and WFAI.

On Monday, March 8, 1976 WFNC changed format with its sister station WQSM-FM 98.1 MHz to country music. While WQSM-FM now played top 40 music.  As a part of the country music format, Brother Strickland, a local gospel announcer ran two hours of gospel music mornings from 5-7 AM first on WQSM-FM and then on WFNC. In January 1977, the gospel music was dropped and WFNC began to air 3 hours of news from 6-9 AM called "Top of the Morning". Brother Strickland moved his program to gospel station WSTS-FM 96.5 MHz in Laurinburg, NC.

The three-hour news show, was followed by "Sound Off" from 9-10 AM. After the 10AM CBS Radio News, WFNC would play country music for the remainder of the broadcast day and overnight. On Sunday mornings WFNC would air local religious programming and public affairs programs such as FCCYC and programs from Fort Bragg Public Affairs Office. After Terry Jordan was hired at WFNC he brought with him, his program, entitled, "At the Console" . "At the Console" had originally aired on crosstown rival WFAI. This program was recorded at various churches in the Fayetteville area and it showcased both religious and classical music played on the organ or pipe organ. Sometimes Terry would showcase the piano. This show aired at 7:30AM Sunday mornings. After WKML 95.7 MHz came on the air in the middle 1980s, they were beating WFNC in the ratings except in the mornings and it was decided to go with a half news and half modified middle-of-the-road music mix in the broadcast day.

By switching frequencies from 940 kHz to 640 kHz, listeners north of Fayetteville could now hear the Friday Night Football Game of the Week. This was begun by Lloyd Foster, who was hired by Victor Dawson in 1952 and he covered Fayetteville High School football games for many seasons.  Lloyd died in 2005 but his legacy continues with men like Charles Koonce, Dave Foster, Steve Driggers, Donnie Dees, Chris Foster, Andrew Foster and Bill McMillan aka Billy Mac who head up the Mid South Sports Network since 1990.  Each Friday night on WFNC AM and WFVL FM the Game of the Week is broadcast. Various interviews with the coaches, and the various scores from other games going on around the area are broadcast on the Taco Bell Scoreboard run usually by Donnie Dees. Interviews with coaches and players; statistics are updated on a timely basis. As of the 2015 fall season, DK Sports Media has taken over the broadcast of Friday Night Football Game of the Week on WFNC. Trey Edge calls the play by play and Bill Boyette does color commentary and the sideline interviews.  Mid South Sports has moved to WAZZ 1490 AM and Sunny 94.3 FM of the Beasley Broadcast Group.

After January 15, 1986 WFNC played middle of the road music and then WFNC was the first news/talk station in North Carolina. Bob Kwesell, whose conservative views offended a number of Raleigh, North Carolina area listeners of WPTF, began broadcasting "Wrestle with Kwesell" on WFNC and WAAV in Wilmington, North Carolina on December 29, 1986.

Four years after the debut of Rush Limbaugh, Alan Colmes and Dean Edell on WFNC, political commentator Charles Adler replaced Colmes and Edell.

From 1995 to 2001, WFNC aired Dr. Laura Schlessinger.

In 1999, Cape Fear Broadcasting announced the sale of its stations to Cumulus.  This sale was challenged by Ocean Broadcasting of Wilmington, North Carolina because it would give Cumulus 6 FMs and an AM in Wilmington, and about 55 percent of market revenue. The sale was completed in May 2001 and the station stopped doing daily editorials

In 2000, Neal Boortz replaced Terry Jordan's local talk show as Jordan became engineer for all Cumulus radio stations (though Jordan went to work for "WE-DO Network" the next year). This left only two local talk shows in the daily schedule.

People still called in and talked about the issues: tax increases, the sheriff's troubles, gadgets that still worked after many years, the local newspaper's policies, and so on.

The station also features a popular weekly sports talk show on Monday nights, "The Powerade Press Box, with Brett & the Bad Boy," co-hosted by Allen Smothers (aka "The Bad Boy of Sports Radio") and local newspaper columnist Brett Friedlander.

After Christmas in 2001, Sean Hannity replaced Dr. Laura.

Gilbert Baez of WTVD replaced Riddle late in 2002 on the morning show, though Riddle, who had worked in Fayetteville radio since 1969, kept hosting "Sound Off" for several more months. Thompson, the last of the station's longtime hosts, left in 2003 after 28 years and ended up on WIDU in 2005. Stan Sandler hosted "Soundoff" until that show was replaced with "The WFNC Newsmakers' Hour" in November. Dr. Sandler continued to host his popular and unique "Stan the History Man," show which debuted in 2002.

Thompson returned to WFNC as news director and co-host, with program director Jim Cooke, of a morning call-in show on August 25, 2008. He replaced Laura Chavis-Price. In February 2009, Thompson was let go.

WFNC dropped "Fayetteville's Morning News", on the air since 1976, on June 1, 2010. Among the voices heard on this program: Johnny Joyce, Dan Mitchell, Alex Lekas, Lisa Schell, Liz Proctor, Gilbert Baez, Paul Michels, Rick Jensen, George Breece, Steve Blackmon, and Laura Chavis-Price. Jim Cooke will continue to read local news. Curtis Wright will debut a new conservative talk radio morning show on both WFNC, Fayetteville, and Cumulus station WAAV, Wilmington: "Curtis Wright on the Beat". Curtis has been the #1 Talk Radio Host in southeastern North Carolina for the last four years, with "The Morning Beat with Curtis Wright", previously heard on WLTT/WNTB-FM in Wilmington. The addition of WFNC allows Wright to reach an even wider scope of listeners throughout southeastern North Carolina. Wright is the founder of the North Carolina Coastal Conservative Coalition, The North Carolina Coastal Conservative Conference, the highly successful "Stand-Up & Vote" candidates' forums, and a creator and featured writer on CarolinaTalkNetwork.com, a newly created internet site linking conservatives across North Carolina.

In 2012, Curtis Wright was dropped from the line up on WFNC.

References

External links
WFNC Official Site

News and talk radio stations in the United States
FNC
Cumulus Media radio stations